George William Kelham (1871–1936) was an American architect, he was most active in the San Francisco Bay Area.

Biography 
Born in Manchester, Massachusetts, Kelham was educated at Harvard University and graduated from the Ecole des Beaux-Arts in 1896. As an employee of New York architects Trowbridge & Livingston, he was sent by the firm to San Francisco for the Palace Hotel in 1906 and remained there after the. building completion in 1909.

Kelham was responsible for the master plan for the Panama–Pacific International Exposition in San Francisco, did significant work on Treasure Island for the Golden Gate International Exposition in 1938, and designed at least five major buildings in the city, along with significant work in Salt Lake City and Los Angeles. He was also supervising architect for the campus of the University of California, Berkeley from 1927 to 1931.

Work 
Kelham's works include:
 Sharon Building (1912), San Francisco,  California.
 Ganter & Mattern Company Building (1912), San Francisco, California; now the California Institute of Integral Studies
 Griffith-McKenzie Building (1914), Fresno, California; Fresno's first skyscraper, now Helm Building
 Panama-Pacific International Exposition (1915), supervising architect
 The old San Francisco Public Library (1917), now the Asian Art Museum of San Francisco
 Farmers' and Merchants' Bank (1917), Stockton, California
 Roble Hall (1917), dormitory for women at Stanford University, Stanford, California
 Bay Terrace Subdivision (1918), 126 individual buildings as housing for Mare Island Naval Shipyard workers, Vallejo, California
 Standard Oil Building (1922), at 225 Bush Street, San Francisco, California
Federal Reserve Bank of San Francisco (1924), 400 Sansome Street, San Francisco, California, NRHP-listed
 Delia Fleishhacker Memorial Building (1925), Zoo Rd. and Sloat Blvd., San Francisco, California, NRHP-listed
 Standard Oil Building (1926), at 605 West Olympic Boulevard, Los Angeles, California
 Russ Building (1927), San Francisco, California
 University of California, Los Angeles, supervising architect for the Westwood campus (1927), including the design for Powell Library, Haines Hall, Kerckoff Hall, Moore Hall and the Men's Gym
 Shell Building, (1929) San Francisco, California
 University of California, Berkeley, supervising architect for multiple individual buildings including: Bowles Hall, 1928; Valley Life Sciences Building, 1930; International House, 1930; Moses Hall, 1931; McLaughlin Hall, 1931; Davis Hall, 1931; Edwards Stadium, 1932; Haas Pavilion/Harmon Men's Gym, 1933,
 Bowles Hall (1928), Stadium and Gayley Way, Berkeley, California (Kelham, George), NRHP-listed
Administration Building, Treasure Island (1938), SE Corner of Avenue of the Palms and California Ave., Treasure Island, California (Day, William Peyton; Kelham, George William), NRHP-listed
Hall of Transportation, Treasure Island. (1938), SE Side of California Ave. between Aves. D & F, Treasure Island, California (Day, William Peyton; Kelham, George William), NRHP-listed
Court of the Moon (1938), Golden Gate International Exposition, Treasure Island, California

References

External links
 
 Entry at NoeHill
 Emporis page regarding Kelham's work
 "George William Kelham (Architect)". Pacific Coast Architecture Database.

1871 births
1936 deaths
20th-century American architects
Beaux Arts architects
American alumni of the École des Beaux-Arts
Harvard University alumni